James Burns Walker (born March 23, 1874; died ???) was a politician in Alberta, Canada and a municipal councillor in Edmonton.

Biography

Walker was born March 23, 1874 in Alberton, Ontario. He worked in the insurance and finance businesses in Hamilton before relocating to Montreal, where he spent seven years as a wholesaler. In April, 1904, he came to Edmonton and worked as an insurance and financial broker.  In the 1906 Edmonton election he ran for Edmonton City Council as an alderman. He was elected to a two-year term after placing third of twelve candidates. He resigned a year into his term. A by-election held in late December 1907 secured Daniel Fraser as replacement.

James Walker was active with the Edmonton Board of Trade (which later became the Edmonton Chamber of Commerce) and the Liberal Party of Canada.

References

Edmonton Public Library biography of James Walker
City of Edmonton biography of James Walker

1874 births
Year of death missing
Politicians from Hamilton, Ontario
Edmonton city councillors
Canadian Presbyterians